Jian'an District, formerly Xuchang County is a district of the prefecture of Xuchang in Henan Province, China. The district is named for |Jian'an, a famous Chinese era during the reign of Emperor Xian, the last emperor of the Han dynasty.

Administrative divisions
As of 2012, this district is divided to 7 towns, 8 townships and 1 ethnic township.
Towns

Townships

Ethnic townships
Aizhuang Hui Township

References

County-level divisions of Henan
Xuchang